José Luis Rodríguez Loreto (born 10 February 1971) is a Spanish retired footballer who played as a striker, and is a manager.

Over six seasons, he amassed Segunda División totals of 176 games and 49 goals in representation of three clubs. In La Liga, he made a combined 35 appearances for Betis and Zaragoza.

Club career
Loreto was born in Seville, Andalusia. After making his professional debut with Real Betis, scoring two goals in 23 games for an eventual La Liga relegation in the 1990–91 season, he excelled at neighbours Córdoba CF in the third division (signing with the club in 1993), which prompted a return to the top flight with Real Zaragoza.

However, Loreto was grossly unsettled at the Aragonese, and played one season in the second level, being crucial for CD Logroñés' promotion whilst on loan. At the end of the campaign, he was released and spent a further four years in division three with Córdoba and Cádiz CF.

Loreto's career revived in the following years, with Real Murcia, being relatively important as the team returned to the top tier in 2003 by netting four times in 26 matches. He was subsequently released, and ended his career in 2006 at the age of 35 after spells in the lower leagues.

Honours
Zaragoza
UEFA Cup Winners' Cup: 1994–95

Murcia
Segunda División: 2002–03

References

External links

Beticopedia profile 
Stats and bio at Cadistas1910 

1971 births
Living people
Footballers from Seville
Spanish footballers
Association football forwards
La Liga players
Segunda División players
Segunda División B players
Tercera División players
Betis Deportivo Balompié footballers
Real Betis players
Córdoba CF players
Real Zaragoza players
CD Logroñés footballers
Cádiz CF players
Real Murcia players
FC Cartagena footballers
Orihuela CF players
Spain youth international footballers
Spain under-21 international footballers
Spain under-23 international footballers
Spanish football managers